Brecé is a commune in the Mayenne department in northwestern France.

Population

Notable people
 

Gérard Moussay (1932–2012), Catholic missionary

See also
Communes of Mayenne

References

Communes of Mayenne